Knight Moves may refer to:

 Knight Moves (film), a 1992 American thriller film
 Knight Moves (video game), a puzzle video game
 Knight Moves (novel), a novel by Walter Jon Williams
 "Knight Moves", a song by Suzanne Vega from her 1985 album Suzanne Vega
 The movement of a knight in chess, two squares in one direction and one square orthogonally

See also
 Night Moves (disambiguation)
 Knight Move